Diaphania translucidalis is a moth in the family Crambidae. It was first described by Achille Guenée in 1854. It is found in Mexico, Guatemala, Costa Rica, Puerto Rico, the Dominican Republic, Venezuela, Brazil, Peru and Bolivia.

The length of the forewings is 14–16 mm for males and 14.5–17 mm for females.

References

Diaphania
Moths described in 1854
Moths of North America
Moths of South America
Taxa named by Achille Guenée